is a song recorded by Japanese singer songwriter Mai Kuraki, taken from her twelfth studio album Kimi Omou: Shunkashūtō (2018). The song was released on August 8, 2018 by Northern Music and served as the theme song to the animation Tsukumogami Kashimasu 8.

Track listing

Charts

Daily charts

Weekly charts

Release history

References

2018 singles
2018 songs
Mai Kuraki songs
Songs written by Mai Kuraki
Song recordings produced by Daiko Nagato